Ali-ye Qurchi (also Romanized as ‘Alī-ye Qūrchī, ‘Alī Qowrchī and ‘Alī Qūrchī) is a village in Hendudur Rural District, Sarband District, Shazand County, Markazi Province, Iran. At the 2006 census, its population was 337, in 76 families.

References 

Populated places in Shazand County